"In The Bad Bad Old Days" was a hit for The Foundations in 1969. It was the fourth hit single for the group. It was written by Tony Macaulay and John McLeod. It went to #8 in the UK Singles Chart, #7 in Ireland, and #23 in Canada. It was also covered by Edison Lighthouse, and appeared on Johnny Johnson and the Bandwagon's Soul Survivor album.

Releases
 The Foundations - "In The Bad Bad Old Days (Before You Loved Me)" / "Give Me Love" - PYE 7N 17417 - 1968
 The Foundations - "In The Bad Bad Old Days (Before You Loved Me)" / "Give Me Love" - UNI 55117 - 1969
 The Good Vibrations - "In The Bad Bad Old Days (Before You Loved Me)" / "Shake A Hand" - Ember 14 310 AT - 1969 
 Edison Lighthouse - "In The Bad Bad Old Days" / "In The Bad Bad Old Days" (Bell USA 45-116, promo) - 1971
 Gumbo - "In The Bad Bad Old Days (Before You Loved Me)" / "Let Me Tell Ya" - Bulldog Records BD 5 - 1975

References

1969 singles
The Foundations songs
Songs written by Tony Macaulay
Tony Burrows songs
Pye Records singles
Songs written by John Macleod (songwriter)
1969 songs